Brian Locking (22 December 1938 – 8 October 2020) was an English musician and songwriter known for his brief tenure as bassist with The Wildcats in 1956 and The Shadows, between 1962 and 1963. During his time with the Shadows he appeared with Cliff Richard in the musical film Summer Holiday. Locking also toured as a session player with numerous artists including rock stars Gene Vincent, Eddie Cochran and Joe Brown, as well as Conway Twitty and Brenda Lee.

Early life and music career
Locking was born on 22 December 1938 in Bedworth, Warwickshire, England and attended St. Anne's School, Spittlegate, and then Huntingtower Road School. After leaving school he worked as a fireman and trainee train driver for British Railways. He began playing double bass in several bands, and was a member of The Harmonica Vagabonds, subsequently called The Vagabonds Skiffle Group; he performed regularly at The 2i's Coffee Bar in Soho, London, where he was asked to tour with Terry Dene and with fellow Grantham-based rocker Vince Eager, whom he had performed with in The Vagabonds.

The Wildcats
He switched to bass guitar, later joining The Wildcats, a backing group for the rock and roll singer Marty Wilde. A fellow Wildcat was the drummer and future member of The Shadows, Brian Bennett.

Locking also played several other instruments including harmonica and clarinet (nicknamed the "licorice stick", which earned Locking the nickname "Licorice"). Vince Eager (previously Roy Taylor) came up with the nickname "Licorice" when introducing Locking on stage when he played in skiffle band The Vagabonds in Ingoldmells in 1956.

When Marty Wilde parted company from The Wildcats, they changed their name to "the Krew Kats" and recorded instrumentals with modest success. Bennett then left to join the Shadows.

The Shadows
In April 1962, whilst having just started performing with Adam Faith, at Bennett's suggestion, Locking was himself invited to join The Shadows to replace the departing bassist Jet Harris. Stylistically, Locking had a solid "less is more" approach, which was the obverse of Harris's adventurous hard-driving style. The Shadows' sound changed as a result. Locking played on some of their best known tracks, including "Dance On", "Foot Tapper" and "Atlantis". He also played the harmonica in live shows and on his signature album track, "Dakota". He appeared in the 1963 Cliff Richard film, Summer Holiday.

After being in the Shadows for only eighteen months, Locking left to pursue his activities with the Jehovah's Witnesses. He remained on the music scene at a more compatible pace and was invited to play double bass on Donovan's first recording session.  He briefly played with the Shadows again five years later while his successor John Rostill was in hospital. In later life Locking was a regular guest playing at Shadows guitar clubs across the UK and abroad. He was also frequently invited to perform with various Shadows-style bands and was fundamental to honouring their legacy in such countries as France and Germany

He reprised his role in the Wildcats at Marty Wilde's 50th Anniversary Concert, where he also appeared on stage with all the surviving Shadows members.

Death
Brian Locking suffered from Bell's palsy, and he was registered blind. He died in a hospice in North Wales on 8 October 2020 aged 81, after having been diagnosed with a tumour on the bladder.

Early career groups (pre-Shadows)

 1956 - The Harmonica Vagabonds, subsequently called The Vagabonds Skiffle Group
 Roy Clarke + Mick Fretwood + Brian Locking + Vince Eager (Roy Taylor)
 1958 – Vince Taylor & the Playboys
Vince Taylor (v) + Jim Sullivan (g) + Tony Sheridan (g) + Brian Locking (b) + Brian Bennett (d)
 1958 – Janice Peters & the Playboys
Janice Peters (v) + Jim Sullivan (g) + Tony Sheridan (g) + Brian Locking (b) + Brian Bennett (d)
 1959 – Marty Wilde's Wildcats
Jim Sullivan (g) + Tony Belcher (g) + Brian Locking (b) + Brian Bennett (d)
 1961 – The Krew Kats
Jim Sullivan (g) + Tony Belcher (g) + Brian Locking (b) + Brian Bennett (d)

References

External links
 
 Discogs.com entry for Vince Taylor And His Playboys
 Discogs.com entry for Janice Peters and The Playboys
 Discogs.com entry for The Krew Kats
 

1938 births
2020 deaths
Clarinetists
English rock bass guitarists
Male bass guitarists
English double-bassists
Male double-bassists
English Jehovah's Witnesses
British rock and roll musicians
People from Bedworth
People from Grantham
The Shadows members
21st-century double-bassists
21st-century clarinetists
Deaths from cancer in Wales
Deaths from bladder cancer